Zvonimir Jurić (born 10 April 1976) is a Croatian retired footballer who spent his whole career playing for NK Zadar. He is currently working as assistant manager of HNK Zadar.

Career statistics

External links

1976 births
Living people
Sportspeople from Zadar
Association football defenders
Croatian footballers
NK Zadar players
Croatian Football League players
First Football League (Croatia) players